Mocetinostat (MGCD0103) is a benzamide histone deacetylase inhibitor undergoing clinical trials for treatment of various cancers including follicular lymphoma, Hodgkin's lymphoma and acute myelogenous leukemia.

One clinical trial (for refractory follicular lymphoma) was temporarily put on hold due to cardiac problems but resumed recruiting in 2009.

In 2010 favourable results were announced from the phase II trial for Hodgkin's lymphoma.

MGCD0103 has also been used as a research reagent where blockage of members of the HDAC-family of histone deacetylases is required.

Mechanism of action
It works by inhibiting mainly histone deacetylase 1 (HDAC1), but also HDAC2, HDAC3, and HDAC11.

References

Pyrimidines
3-Pyridyl compounds
Benzanilides
Histone deacetylase inhibitors